WEAS-FM is a mainstream urban radio station licensed to Springfield, Georgia, but serving the Savannah Area. The station is owned by Cumulus Media.  Its studios are located on Television Circle in Savannah and utilizes a transmitter located west of the city in unincorporated Chatham County.

WEAS(FM) began operation in 1968 as an easy listening station to counter the country music format of the sister AM station (which had formerly been WJIV, with an R&B format, until 1960, and later as WEAS with the country format); the station's format was freeform progressive rock in the early part of the next decade. By the mid-1970s, the FM station switched to a similar urban format as today, as did the sister AM station, prior to it being sold and changed to a sports information station.  The AM and FM stations were used to be owned by E.D. "Dee" Rivers, Jr, son of a former governor of Georgia.

WEAS-FM was licensed to Savannah, but moved to Springfield in order to allow WTYB to move to Tybee Island, in the Savannah metropolitan area. The station has historically targeted the African-American population in the Savannah area.

WEAS-FM was automated in its first few years, but changed to a live DJ when the format was changed from Easy Listening to R&B.

Former on-air staff
During WEAS's time as Sunday morning Gospel music station:
Deacon Charles L. Palmer who established the "Stairways to Heaven Program (1991-1997) (deceased July 10, 2001)
During WEAS's time as a country music station:
JayAllen Brimmer (1960-1969) (deceased)
Norman "Lefty" Lindsey (1961-1970), father of Lawanda Lindsey
Everett Langford (1963-1967) (was also Chief Engineer)
Tex Lowther  (1969-1975) The Bumper to Bumper Club

External links
WEAS-FM official website

African-American history in Savannah, Georgia
Mainstream urban radio stations in the United States
EAS-FM
Cumulus Media radio stations